
Year 397 BC was a year of the pre-Julian Roman calendar. At the time, it was known as the Year of the Tribunate of Iullus, Albinus, Medullinus, Maluginensis, Fidenas and Capitolinus (or, less frequently, year 357 Ab urbe condita). The denomination 397 BC for this year has been used since the early medieval period, when the Anno Domini calendar era became the prevalent method in Europe for naming years.

Events 
<onlyinclude>

By place

Greece 
 Called on by the Ionians to assist them against the Persian King Artaxerxes II, King Agesilaus II of Sparta launches an ambitious campaign in Asia Minor.

Carthage 
 Siege of Syracuse: A Carthaginian expeditionary army (some 50,000 men) under Himilco crosses to Sicily. They conquer the north coast and put Dionysius I, tyrant of Syracuse, on the defensive and besiege Syracuse. However, the Carthaginian army suffers from the plague. The Syracuse counterattacked and completely defeat Himilco's army. Himilco has to escape back to Carthage.
 The Carthaginians establish the town of Lilybaeum in Sicily to replace Motya.

Births 
 Dionysius II, son of Dionysius I, tyrant of Syracuse (d. 343 BC)

References